Ayyub ibn Habib al-Lakhmi (fl. AD 716) was the second Umayyad Governor of Al-Andalus who succeeded his cousin Abd al-Aziz ibn Musa. He ruled for only 6 months, after which he moved to Cordoba and made it the capital of Muslim Iberia in place of Toledo.

References 

8th-century Arabs
Umayyad governors of Al-Andalus
Umayyad conquest of Hispania
8th-century people from the Umayyad Caliphate